The 2015 Hobart International was a women's tennis tournament played on outdoor hard courts. It was the 22nd edition of the event and part of the WTA International tournaments of the 2015 WTA Tour. It took place at the Hobart International Tennis Centre in Hobart, Australia from 11 through 17 January 2015.

Points and prize money

Point distribution

Prize money

1 Qualifiers prize money is also the Round of 32 prize money
* per team

Singles main-draw entrants

Seeds

1 Rankings as of 12 January 2015.

Other entrants
The following players received wildcards into the singles main draw:
  Daniela Hantuchová
  Olivia Rogowska
  Storm Sanders

The following player received entry as a special exempt:
  Zheng Saisai

The following players received entry from the qualifying draw:
  Madison Brengle
  Richèl Hogenkamp
  Kateryna Kozlova
  Johanna Larsson

The following player received entry as a lucky loser:
  Sílvia Soler Espinosa

Withdrawals
Before the tournament
  Varvara Lepchenko (right ankle injury) → replaced by  Sílvia Soler Espinosa

During the tournament
  Kaia Kanepi (viral illness)

Retirements
  Christina McHale (right shoulder injury)
  Mirjana Lučić-Baroni (left leg injury)
  Zheng Saisai (left thigh injury)

Doubles main-draw entrants

Seeds

1 Rankings as of 5 January 2015.

Withdrawals
During the tournament
  Mirjana Lučić-Baroni (left leg injury)
  Sloane Stephens (abdominal injury)

Retirements
  Cara Black (viral illness)

Champions

Singles

  Heather Watson def.  Madison Brengle, 6–3, 6–4

Doubles

  Kiki Bertens /  Johanna Larsson def.  Vitalia Diatchenko /  Monica Niculescu, 7–5, 6–3

References
Official website

 
Hobart International
Hobart International
Hobart International